The National Maritime Historical Society (NMHS) is a non-profit organization in America devoted to historical ship preservation and maritime education.

The society's mission is to educate Americans—and especially its youth—about maritime accomplishments throughout American history and their continued relevance for national prosperity and cultural vitality. Specifically, the NMHS educational agenda includes exploring America's maritime heritage, advocating first-hand experiences on ships, and encouraging visits to maritime museums. An active participant among maritime institutions, NMHS is a sponsor of the Maritime Heritage Conferences and serves as a member of the Council of American Maritime Museums; it was instrumental in establishing the American Society of Marine Artists, the American Ship Trust and the National Maritime Alliance.

Since 1972 the NMHS has published a quarterly magazine, Sea History, featuring articles on contemporary and historic marine art; Historic Ships on Lee Shore, which brings attention to historic ships in need, a Sea History for Kids section (profiling marine and maritime professionals) and Animals in Sea History by Richard J. King. Since 2004, the magazine has also included a regular column by Peter McCracken (founder of Serials Solutions and ShipIndex.org), called 'Maritime History on the Internet.'

The NMHS holds two annual gala awards dinners, and gives their Distinguished Service Award to important people in the maritime field. One of the dinners is in Washington DC. From 2018 it has been held at the Mayflower Hotel.   In former years it took place at the National Press Club.  The other annual awards dinner is held at the New York Yacht Club in Manhattan.

References

External links 
 National Maritime Historical Society

Maritime history of the United States
Historical societies of the United States
Historical societies in New York (state)